Guéra is one of four departments in Guéra, a region of Chad. Its capital is Melfi.

Guéra Department has a population of 110,877 (2016 survey) and 192 villages.

References 

Departments of Chad
Guéra Region